Fortuny is a surname of Catalan origin. It may refer to:
 Enzo Fortuny, Mexican voice actor
 José Manuel Fortuny (1916–2005), Guatemalan Communist leader
 Mariano Fortuny (painter) (1835–1874), Spanish painter
 Mariano Fortuny (designer) (1871–1949), Spanish fashion designer and lighting engineer, son of the painter

See also 
 Fortuny Museum, Venice, Italy
 Palazzo Fortuny or Palazzo Pesaro Orfei, palace in Venice, Italy

Catalan-language surnames